Deer Valley Unified School District #97 (DVUSD) is a Pre-K–12 school district, headquartered in Phoenix, Arizona, United States. DVUSD is the fifth largest school district in the state of Arizona, serving areas of Phoenix, Glendale, Peoria, Anthem, New River and numerous unincorporated areas of northwest Maricopa County. Situated within the Sonoran Desert, the District has grown from its modest beginnings as a county accommodation school located in New River in 1934 to 37 campuses serving 36,261 students: 15 K–6 elementary schools, 13 K–8 schools, three middle schools, and five comprehensive high schools, plus an online school and an alternative school. Early childhood education opportunities are offered through DVUSD Community Education Preschool/PreKindergarten (15 sites), and Head Start (five sites). Twelve schools receive Title I funding. District facilities include District Office, Support Services Center, Transportation and Administrative Services.

Attendance area
 the Cañon Elementary School District sends high school students and junior high level special education students to DVUSD. In 1984, 27 students from Cañon attended DVUSD. That year Deer Valley sued Cañon, which stated it was unable to pay for the tuition costs of the district and acknowledged that it was billed for the correct amount. The Arizona Republic described this as a "friendly lawsuit", since according to the DVUSD officials, Cañon district officials stated that the lawsuit was the only mechanism through which it could pay DVUSD.

Schools

K–6 schools

 Arrowhead Elementary School
 Constitution Elementary School
 Copper Creek Elementary School
 Desert Sage Elementary School
 Esperanza Elementary School
 Greenbrier Elementary School
 Las Brisas Elementary School
 Legend Springs Elementary School
 Mirage Elementary School
 Mountain Shadows Elementary School
 New River Elementary School
 Park Meadows Elementary School
 Sunrise Elementary School
 The Traditional Academy at Bellair
 Village Meadows Elementary School

K–8 schools

 Anthem School
 Canyon Springs STEM Academy
 Desert Mountain School
 Diamond Canyon School
 Gavilan Peak School
 Highland Lakes School
 Inspiration Mountain School (Opening 2022)
 Norterra Canyon School
 Paseo Hills School
 Sierra Verde STEAM School
 Sonoran Foothills School
 Stetson Hills School
 Sunset Ridge School
 Terramar Academy of the Arts
 Union Park School
 West Wing School

Middle schools
 Deer Valley Middle School
 Desert Sky Middle School
 Hillcrest Middle School

High schools
 Barry Goldwater High School
 Boulder Creek High School
 Deer Valley High School
 Mountain Ridge High School
 Sandra Day O’Connor High School

Specialized programs
 Vista Peak (Alternative Blended Learning Environment)
 International Baccalaureate Program at Barry Goldwater High School
 Aspire Deer Valley's Online Academy

References

External links
 

School districts in Phoenix, Arizona
School districts established in 1934
School districts in Maricopa County, Arizona
Education in Yavapai County, Arizona
1934 establishments in Arizona